Sandrigo is a town in the province of Vicenza, Veneto, northern Italy. It is east of SP248 provincial road.

The town is home to the "Festa del Baccalà", where the typical dish baccalà alla vicentina is prepared with the stockfish imported from Røst, a Norwegian town belonging to the Lofoten.

Twin towns
Sandrigo is twinned with:
  Røst, Norway

Sources

External links

Cities and towns in Veneto